Carlo di Ciacca (born 1 November 1977 in Scotland) is a Scottish former rugby union player who played for Glasgow Warriors at the Hooker position.

Rugby Union career

Amateur career

He played for West of Scotland at amateur level and eventually captained the team, before being called in the Glasgow Warriors squad in season 2000-01.

After leaving Edinburgh in 2004, di Ciacca signed for Glasgow Hutchesons Aloysians RFC.

Professional career

Di Ciacca said of the Glasgow move: "One moment I was psyching myself up to lead West against Edinburgh Accies in Division Two. The next I was thrown in the deep end against one of the best teams in Europe. My ambition is to become a full-time professional and it has been important to get my foot in the door."

He played twice in the Heineken Cup for Glasgow

He later signed for Edinburgh Rugby for season 2001-02 and played for them till 2004. He made his first competitive start for Edinburgh in January 2002.

International career

He played internationally for Scotland A.

Hospitality career

He studied hospitality at Glasgow Caledonian University. Since 2007 he has been the owner of the Amaretto restaurant in Bridge of Weir, Renfrewshire.

References

External links 
 Pro12 Profile
 Statbunker Profile
 EPCR Profile

1977 births
Living people
Scottish rugby union players
Glasgow Warriors players
Edinburgh Rugby players
Glasgow Hutchesons Aloysians RFC players
West of Scotland FC players
Scotland 'A' international rugby union players
Rugby union hookers